Akhil Bharatiya Kamgar Sena is a trade union centre in Maharashtra, India. ABKS is the labour wing of the Akhil Bharatiya Sena of Arun Gawli. Gawli is the president of ABKS. At the time of its foundation, ABKS claimed a membership of 50 000. Soon after the launching of ABKS, the new union was able to take over some workplace unions previously run by Bharatiya Kamgar Sena or Maharashtra General Kamgar Union, in companies like Oberoi Hotels and the Tata Cancer Hospital. ABKS was able to establish a foothold amongst the employees at National Rayon, Reliance and public sector units like SICOM and IRCON.

In 2002, ABKS was able to gain influence amongst the works at the Mumbai Port Trust.

References

Healthcare trade unions in India
Organizations with year of establishment missing
Trade unions in Maharashtra